The elegant honeyeater (Microptilotis cinereifrons) is a species of bird in the family Meliphagidae. 
It is native to the Bird's Tail Peninsula (Papua New Guinea).
Its natural habitats are subtropical or tropical moist lowland forests and subtropical or tropical moist montane forests.

References

elegant honeyeater
Birds of the Papuan Peninsula
elegant honeyeater
elegant honeyeater